is a national park in Okinawa Prefecture, Japan. Established in 2014, it is located in and around the Kerama Islands. The Kerama Islands previously formed part of Okinawa Kaigan Quasi-National Park.

See also
 List of national parks of Japan

References

External links
  Map of Kerama Shotō National Park

National parks of Japan
Parks and gardens in Okinawa Prefecture
Protected areas established in 2014
2014 establishments in Japan